Clothall is a village and civil parish in the county of Hertfordshire, England, with a population of 358. At the 2011 Census the civil parish had a population of 150. The village contains the Church of St Mary the Virgin, which was built of flint and stone around 1350–70, though parts of the church are older, dating to the 12th century.

References

Villages in Hertfordshire
Civil parishes in Hertfordshire
North Hertfordshire District